Ryan Willis (born September 28, 1996) is an American football quarterback for the Memphis Showboats of the United States Football League (USFL). He played college football for the Virginia Tech Hokies. In 2019, Willis finished his senior season at Virginia Tech.

Early life and college
Willis came out of high school as a three-star prospect, as rated by Rivals.com. He chose to play for Kansas over Wyoming, Illinois, Kansas State, and Tulsa. In his first start at Kansas, a Big 12 conference game versus the Baylor Bears, Willis broke his career high in passing, throwing 158 yards, on 20 completions and 36 attempts, and one touchdown. In a near win versus the 15th ranked TCU Horned Frogs, Willis threw 20–41 passes for 203 yards and a touchdown. He started the final 8 games of the season for the Jayhawks in 2015, completing 165 of 315 passes for 1,719 yards, 8 touchdowns and 10 interceptions.

He played in seven games, starting two, in 2016, completing 72 of 117 yards for 811 yards, 3 touchdowns and 7 interceptions.

In January 2017, it was announced that Willis was transferring to play for the Virginia Tech Hokies. At Virginia Tech, Willis joined the team as a walk-on with no guarantee that he would make the team; but he did and spent the 2017 season sitting out due to NCAA transfer rules.

In 2018, Willis has appeared in two games and made his first start at Virginia Tech at #22 Duke in Durham after an injury to incumbent starter Josh Jackson. Virginia Tech won the game 31–14, and Willis was 17-of-27 for 332 yards and three touchdown passes.

Professional career

Willis signed with the Linemen of The Spring League in May 2021. He was the MVP for The Spring League Megabowl in 2021 playing for the championship team.

Chicago Bears
On December 18, 2021, Willis was signed to the Chicago Bears practice squad. On December 25, he was "flexed" to the Bears' active roster to back up starter Nick Foles against the Seattle Seahawks. He signed a reserve/future contract with the Bears on January 11, 2022. He was released by the team on May 11, 2022.

St. Louis BattleHawks
On September 29, 2022, XFL Reporter Mike Mitchell reported that 8 quarterbacks that worked with Jordan Palmer have reportedly signed with each team. Willis was signed to the St. Louis BattleHawks.

Memphis Showboats
On February 8, 2023, Willis signed with the Memphis Showboats of the United States Football League (USFL).

References

1996 births
Living people
American football quarterbacks
Bishop Miege High School alumni
Chicago Bears players
Kansas Jayhawks football players
Memphis Showboats (2022) players
Players of American football from Kansas
Sportspeople from Overland Park, Kansas
St. Louis BattleHawks players
The Spring League players
Virginia Tech Hokies football players